Na Piarsaigh are a hurling and Gaelic football club based in the north side of Cork City, Ireland.

History

Formation
In 1943 a group of idealistic young men drawn mostly from the hurling nursery of North Mon laid the foundations of Cumann Iomana & Peile Na Piarsaigh.

The group had its first formal meeting in the presbytery of the North Cathedral. The young men called upon one of their teachers, Donnacha Ó Murchú, for guidance and assistance. This led to him becoming the first Uachtarán [president] of the club, with Derry Terry serving as Runaí [secretary] and Paddy Sutton as Cisteoir [treasurer].

In choosing a name for the club the members sought one which would reflect their aims and ideals. Padraig Pearse, it was felt, because of his underlying love of Ireland and all things Irish, reflected those ideals admirably. Thus the name "Na Piarsaigh" ["The Pearses"] was adopted.

A set of playing-gear colours (black and amber) was acquired. Later in 1951 the symbolic red hand of Ulster with severed thumb was selected as the club crest after careful consideration. The red hand represents the island that is Ireland, the severed thumb the six north-eastern counties still under foreign rule. The legend is that when Ireland is reunited the thumb will again rejoin the fingers to create a strong and useful hand.

The newly formed club, as part of its policy, decided to conduct its affairs as far as possible through the medium of Irish. Indeed, the policy extended to the field of play where the players addressed one another in the native tongue. So novel was this approach to GAA affairs that it led to a certain amount of resentment amongst other clubs. The national outlook was then in such a state during what is termed the "Emergency" [the Second World War] that any willingness to promote Irish language culture generally met with strong opposition. The opposition to club activities by the local clergy, in fact, caused Na Piarsaigh to lose the use of St. Mary's Hall.

In relation to this the then Uactarán, Donnacha Ó Murchú. recalled the words of a prominent local clergyman of the day, "We don't want any of that oul' stuff going on here". This, however, did not unduly upset the youthful members who strove all the more to achieve their aims and ideals. By 1946 the membership had grown from thirty to seventy, but as yet the club had failed to win a title in either hurling or football. However, in the same year the City Division Junior Hurling Championship was won, no mean achievement in three years of existence. During this period also, minor teams were fielded but without much success. Training for matches was a problem without a club ground. Training took place in such diverse locations as the Lee Fields, Rivers Town, the Fair Field, and Brown's Field, which was located near the present-day Church of the Ascension in Gurranabraher.

Acquisition of club grounds
As the club grew and expanded in the late 1940s, the need for a playing field was keenly felt and expressed by the then Secretary Donncha O Griofa in his annual report of 1951 when he wrote: "The lack of a playing field of our own is greatly impeding the advancement of our teams. As members are unable to get sufficient training for matches, they ultimately wander to other codes".

This appeal by the Secretary was to bear fruit six years later when after hard years of fund-raising the club purchased a field at The Commons, Fair Hill. In this eventful year of 1951 the need for a properly organised minor section was strongly mooted. Again, Donncha O Griofa, in his address, referred to this when he wrote: "Films and books cannot teach the game. Give young boys hurleys and footballs and they will do the rest. Encourage them to think they are the coming champions. The success of our club must ultimately rest in the generation to follow".

Sporting success
In 1946 the Club won its first title at Junior level, annexing the City title. However this group of dedicated workers and followers had to wait until 1953 to achieve their finest hour, when the County Junior Hurling title was added.

Three Minor Hurling County titles were added in 1961, 62 and 63, in what should have laid the foundations for success at Senior level. However disappointment was to follow with heartbreaking defeats in the mid-1960s.

In football success at Junior level came with victory in the County final in 1964, followed quickly by County success at Intermediate level the following year. Thus the Club had gone from Junior level to Senior in the shortest possible period.

However it was to be the 1970s in which much of the groundwork for today's success at Senior level was laid with a succession of brilliant hurling teams at under age level.

Noted players

 Daire Connery
 Mick Ellard
 John Gardiner
 Christopher Joyce
 Rónán McGregor
 Mark Mullins
 Aisake Ó hAilpín
 Seán Óg Ó hAilpín
 Setanta Ó hAilpín
 Teu Ó hAilpín
 Tony O'Sullivan
 Roger Tuohy

Honours
Cork Senior Hurling Championships: 3 (1990, 1995, 2004)
Cork Senior Hurling Leagues: 5 (1978, 1988, 1992, 1997, 2013)
Cork Intermediate Football Championship: 1 (1966) Runners-up 2014
 Cork Junior Hurling Championship: 1 (1953)
 Cork City Junior Hurling Championship 6 (1946, 1953, 1979, 1989, 1995, 1997)
 Cork City Junior Football Championship 4 (1964, 1965, 1974, 2005)
Cork Junior Football Championship: 1 (1965)
Cork Under-21 Hurling Championships: 3 (1980, 1981, 1987)
Cork Minor Hurling Championships: 11 (1960, 1961, 1962, 1965, 1977, 1978, 1981, 1982, 1995, 1996, 2016)
Cork Minor Football Championships 3 (1981, 1994, 1995)
Féile na nGael 7 (1973, 1974, 1977, 1980, 1991, 2006, 2017)

Individual Players honours
All-Ireland Senior Hurling Championship Winners:
Donal 'Fox' Sheehan: 1 (1966)
Tony O'Sullivan: 3 (1984, 1986, 1990)
Seán Óg Ó hAilpín: 3 (1999, 2004, 2005)
John Gardiner: 2 (2004, 2005)

GAA All Stars Awards winners (hurling):
Tony O'Sullivan: 5 (1982, 1986, 1988, 1990, 1992)
Seán Óg Ó hAilpín: 3 (2003, 2004, 2005)
Setanta Ó hAilpín: 1 (2003)
John Gardiner: 1 (2005)

Tony O'Sullivan is among an elite group of Cork players who hold five All Star Awards.
Tony, along with his former Cork team mates John Fenton and Jimmy Barry-Murphy
hold the distinction of heading the roll of honour as the most decorated Cork All Stars.

All Stars Hurler of the Year:
Seán Óg Ó hAilpín: 1 (2004)

GPA Hurler of the Year:
John Gardiner: 1 (2005)

All Stars Young Hurler of the Year:
Setanta Ó hAilpín: 1 (2003)

References

External links
Na Piarsaigh GAA Site
Cork GAA Site

Gaelic games clubs in County Cork
Hurling clubs in County Cork
Gaelic football clubs in County Cork